Bannay may refer to the following places in France:

Bannay, Cher, a commune in the department of Cher
Bannay, Marne, a commune in the department of Marne
Bannay, Moselle, a commune in the department of Moselle